Kur Bolagh (also Romanized as Kūr Bolāgh) is a village in Qeshlaq Rural District, in the Central District of Ahar County, East Azerbaijan Province, Iran. At the 2006 census, its population was 140, in 31 families.

References 

Populated places in Ahar County